Buddy Hutchins is a dark comedy thriller film starring Jamie Kennedy, written and directed by Jared Cohn, and produced by Richard Switzer and Gabriel Campisi.

Plot
Buddy Hutchins is just a regular guy doing his best to support a wife and two kids. A recovering alcoholic, Buddy hasn't had a drink for the better part of a year, but it turns out the only reward for his good behavior is a failing business and a cheating wife. Throw in a ruthless bounty hunter and a hot-tempered ex, and Buddy's already short fuse is about to blow. Pushed over the edge and armed with a chainsaw, Buddy Hutchins is out for blood.

Cast
Jamie Kennedy as Buddy Hutchins
Sally Kirkland as Bertha
Sara Malakul Lane as Evelyn
Hiram A. Murray as Detective Hunter
David Gere as Don
Steve Hanks as Troy
Richard Switzer as Joel
Demetrius Stear as Ryan
Remington Moses as Stephanie

Production
The film was shot in February 2014 in Los Angeles, California with a large portion shot in Van Nuys, California, and director Jared Cohn's house. The film was executive produced by Santino Aquino, Gabriel Campisi, and Judy Kim, and stars Jamie Kennedy, Sally Kirkland, and Sara Malakul Lane. The screenplay was also written by Cohn, ten years prior to production.

Release
The film was released on February 14, 2015 (Valentine's Day) in the United States.

References

External links

2015 films
2010s thriller films
American slasher films
Films about alcoholism
Films shot in Los Angeles
2010s English-language films
Films directed by Jared Cohn
2010s American films